Monster Dog is a 1986 Spanish horror film directed by Claudio Fragasso and starring Alice Cooper and Victoria Vera.

Plot summary 
Vince Raven (Cooper) is performing in the music video for his new song, "Identity Crisis." Later, Vince, Vince's girlfriend Sandra, and Vince's film crew drive to Vince's old childhood home to shoot a music video.

While waiting for the crew, Jos, the caretaker of the house, prepares a welcome home party for Vince. He is interrupted when he begins hearing strange noises. After searching around the house, he walks outside to find a pack of wild canines growling outside his door. The canines outnumber him and attack him.

That evening the crew continue their drive to the house. Along the way, they run into two police officers, Sheriff Morrison and Deputy Dan, who are standing at a barricade. The police warn the crew that there has been another "attack". After the crew leave, the sheriff and his deputy are both killed by the Monster Dog in the woods.

The drive comes to a halt when Vince hits a German Shepherd with the van. The crew cannot stand to watch it suffer in pain, so Vince puts it to rest by killing it with a large rock. While the crew mourns the dog's death, an old man in blood-stained clothing attacks them. He warns them that they "will all die", except for Vince. The old man then runs into the woods. Vince and Sandra chase after him to get him to a hospital, but the Monster Dog scares them back into the van.

When the crew finally arrives at the house, Jos is nowhere to be found. Vince is worried about what happened to Jos, so he takes a shotgun and searches around the house. While the crew waits for Vince to return, they discover the food for the party. After searching the house, Vince gives up and wanders into a room where he discovers a book about werewolves.

Later that night Angela has a nightmare that the bloody old man murders everyone in the house. She runs from him and tries to get to Vince. She finds him reading a book in a rocking chair, his back toward her. She slowly walks up to him from behind until he gets up, revealing that he is the Monster Dog. Angela wakes up screaming and the crew tries to calm her down. She tells them about her dream and how Vince was a "werewolf".

Vince is later found reading in the same rocking chair as in Angela's nightmare. Sandra comes to talk to him, and he tells her the story of his father's death. He says that his father had lycanthropy (the werewolf curse) and that he was blamed for many deaths. He was stabbed with pitchforks, doused with gasoline, and burnt alive.

The next day, the crew decides to begin filming their next music video for Vince's song, "See Me in The Mirror". Angela is dressed as a bride and Vince sings to his reflection in a mirror. As Angela walks down the stairs, she notices the shadow of a body that is resting against the upstairs window. The light outside flashes and the body crashes through the window. It is revealed to be Jos's corpse. Angela leaves the house in shock while the others search the roof to find out what happened. Vince runs after Angela as a mysterious car pulls up to the house.

The four armed men con their way into the house and quickly overpower the crew.  They wait inside until Vince and Angela return.  As they try to come in, one of the men shoots and kills Angela by mistake, forcing Vince to escape.

Vince heads to the roof where he has a shootout with some of the armed men. Meanwhile, a pack of wild dogs break into the house and attack the crew and one of the armed men. Sandra and Marilou run upstairs, with the dogs chasing them while the Monster Dog appears and kills the others.  Strangely the dogs become calm when Vince appears, allowing them to get to the car.  Because the armed men had the keys, they have to go back and get them, leaving Marilou in the car alone.

Vince and Sandra return to the car with the keys after another run in with a gunman. As they drive off, Marilou's corpse falls on Sandra and the Monster Dog attacks Vince from the back seat. Sandra jumps out and hears the car get destroyed with the sound of a gunshot. She finds the old man, who tells her about how he was attacked by Vince's father, which resulted in him becoming a "lycanthrope". The old man dies after telling Sandra that he has bitten Vince and that Vince will now become a werewolf.  Sandra leaves to find Vince, who tells her to kill him before he turns into a werewolf. As Vince begins his transformation into the Monster Dog, Sandra shoots him.

The film ends with a reprise of the "Identity Crisis" video, now interspersed with clips from the story.

Cast
 Alice Cooper as Vincent Raven 
 Victoria Vera as Sandra 
 Carlos Santurio as Frank
 Pepa Sarsa (credited as Jose Sarsa) as Marilou 
 Pepita James as Angela
 Emilio Linder as Jordan
 Ricardo Palacios as Sheriff Morrison
 Barta Barri (credited as B. Barta Barri) as Old Man

Production
Prior to directing Monster Dog, director Claudio Fragasso had been working as a screenwriter since the mid-1970s and by the 1980s often worked with Bruno Mattei on women-in-prison films and gory horror films. While often co-directing films with Mattei uncredited, he moved his work to Spain for his film Monster Dog. Fragasso was contacted by Dutch producer Eduard Salui who had seen the film Rats: Night of Terror which had uncredited co-direction by Fragasso. Salui suggested to make another animal themed film to distribute on the home video market, which led to Fragasso and his wife Rossella Drudi write the script and story that was influenced by the new American horror films An American Werewolf in London and The Howling. Monster Dog was part of a two-film deal with line producer for Carlos Aured, with the other film being The Falling which was shot back-to-back with Monster Dog.

For the cast, Fragasso had Alice Cooper, an American musician noted for his relation to horror and macabre imagery. Cooper spoke about the film in an interview with The Georgia Straight newspaper in 1986, stating that he wanted to do a cheap and sleazy film, stating "They told me it would never get released in the movie houses, and I said, 'Great. It should just be one of those movies you can rent at the video place.' And they said that's what it would be, so I did it ... I got a lot of money for it [laughs]. I think I was the biggest part of the budget." He discussed the film again in 2009 that he took the film right after leaving rehab for his alcoholism to "see if [he] could work sober". Aured spoke positively about working with Cooper, stating that Cooper only gave them two demands: a supply of cold Coca-Cola and a VCR in his room so he could watch old Western films. Aured also stated that Cooper took weekends off from shooting to play golf. Actress Victoria Vera later recalled the film was "wretched and unpleasant, but I had a tremendous time together with Alice; he is a very fabulous and funny person." Fragasso also remembered Cooper fondly, saying "I developed a good working relationship with Cooper ... [he] has a passion for horror movies, and every night we would watch them together as if we were little boys!"

Monster Dog was shot in five weeks in Torrelodones, Spain. Fragasso stated that the special effects caused a lot of delays while filming. The special effects shots were all shot in the last week, this included creating a large puppet head for the monster which broke on the first scene it was used in. This led to the screenwriters to re-write part of the script to make use of the puppet without being able to operate it.

Two songs in the film were composed by Spanish arranger and composer Teddy Bautista. Fragasso claimed that Sarlui had edited the film without his permission, stating that about 20 minutes of the film were cut and that "what has circulated on VHS and DVD is not the film that I shot." noting that all the scenes he deemed the best were cut. Fragasso and Drudi made different claims later, still stating that about 20 minutes were cut but that it was edited to be made at a faster pace. The film credits four additional editors.

Release
Despite websites such as the Internet Movie Database and other references sources suggesting the film being released in Italy in December 1984, the film was never even submitted to the Italian rating board for a screening certificate. The film's earliest release was on home video in the United States on June 15, 1986 where it was distributed by Trans World Entertainment. The film was released theatrically in Spain by Union Films S.A. on August 16, 1988. In Spain, it grossed a 2019 equivalent of 128,737.53 Euros with an audience of 53,438 spectators.

The two songs in the film performed by Cooper remained unreleased until 1999 when they appeared on the box set The Life and Crimes of Alice Cooper. A 7-inch single was released of the two songs in limited edition of 100 copies in 2012.

See also
 Alice Cooper filmography
 List of horror films of 1986
 List of Spanish films of 1986

References

Footnotes

Sources

External links 
 
 

1986 films
Spanish werewolf films
English-language Spanish films
1986 horror films
Films set in the United States
Films shot in Madrid
1980s monster movies
Films directed by Claudio Fragasso